Qarvchah-e Sofla (also Romanized as Qarvchāh-e Soflá) is a village in Il Gavark Rural District, in the Central District of Bukan County, West Azerbaijan Province, Iran. At the 2006 census, its population was 320, in 55 families.

References 

Populated places in Bukan County